The Diocese of Venice in Florida is a Latin Church ecclesiastical territory or diocese of the Catholic Church in Florida. It was founded on June 16, 1984 with the purpose of serving the southwestern portion of the state. The Diocese of Venice includes ten counties: Charlotte, Collier, DeSoto, Glades, Hardee, Hendry, Highlands, Lee, Manatee, and Sarasota.

As Bishop John Joseph Nevins resigned for reasons of age on January 19, 2007, he was succeeded as ordinary by Bishop Frank Joseph Dewane. The Diocese of Venice in Florida is a suffragan diocese in the ecclesiastical province of the metropolitan Archdiocese of Miami.

History

Beginnings of Catholicism in Southern Florida

1510s: Juan Ponce de Leon and Calusa resistance to missions
The first Spanish explorers came ashore in what is now the diocese in the 16th century. Their arrival brought the first Catholic missionaries, whose purpose was to set up permanent missions in the name of Spain and the Catholic Church. Conquistador Juan Ponce de León was the first European to arrive in Florida, in 1513. He explored its west coast between 1513 and 1521.

Ponce de Leon encountered the resident Calusa tribe, who first welcomed the Spanish, but later objected because the explorers had desecrated their sacred places, and fought the invaders. The Calusa objected to the construction of missions, and frequently attacked them. When Ponce de Leon was injured in an attack the expedition and mission on the West Coast was abandoned.

1539-1542: Hernando de Soto's expedition 
Seven years later Spanish explorer Hernando De Soto brought priests to Florida in an attempt to evangelize the native tribes during an exploration of the coast from 1539-1542. DeSoto led an expedition of 10 ships and 620 men, which included 12 priests. They landed near what is now Bradenton on May 25, 1539. Mass was celebrated almost every day by the expedition priests. Later, when DeSoto landed at Shaw's Point near the mouth of Tampa Bay, the men named it "La Bahia de Espiritu Santo," in honor of the Holy Spirit. The sheer number of DeSoto's forces caused the Calusa to abandon their settlements along the harbor entrance. (A memorial to the Eucharist and a Memorial Cross were built and dedicated in the area near DeSoto's landings by Bishop John J. Nevins in 1994 at De Soto National Memorial in Bradenton.)

1560s: Jesuit mission at Mound Key
Other efforts to bring missionaries to Florida were unsuccessful until Pedro Menéndez de Avilés, founder of Saint Augustine and Governor of Spanish Florida, sought peace with the Calusa and founded a military outpost there in February 1566. Pedro Menendez sought assistance from the Jesuits, who agreed to send a small contingent to Florida. Before leaving the San Carlos Bay area, Menéndez established a Jesuit mission at Mound Key near the mouth of the Estero River in what is now Lee County, and left a garrison of soldiers to guard it. Called San Antonio de Carlos, it was the first such mission in the Spanish New World and the first Catholic presence within the territory of the present Diocese of Venice in Florida. Father Juan Rogel and Brother Francisco de Villareal spent the winter studying the Calusa language, and proceeded to work among the tribe in southern Florida. The establishment there of a fort and settlement at Mound Key was the first such effort to colonize the area. A chapel was built at the Jesuit mission in 1567. Due to frequent conflict with the Calusa, the Mound Key area was abandoned by the Spanish in 1569.

Post Civil War
After the end of the US Civil War in 1865, missionaries from Savannah, St. Augustine, and Tampa, began visiting the areas south of Tampa Bay that later became the Diocese of Venice. In 1889 the care of the area within the Diocese fell under the jurisdiction of the Jesuit Fathers from Tampa, who made regular visits to Bradenton, Fort Myers, Arcadia, and adjacent missions. The first missions and Catholic communities within the current Diocese of Venice in Florida were located at Sacred Heart in Bradenton (1868), Immaculate Conception of the Blessed Virgin Mary (later St. Francis Xavier) in Fort Myers (1878), St. Paul in Arcadia (1882), Sacred Heart in Punta Gorda (1888), St. Martha in Sarasota (1889), St. Michael in Wauchula (1915), St. Joseph in Bradenton (1915), and St. Catherine in Sebring (1918).

Erection of the Diocese

The Diocese of Venice in Florida was erected by Pope John Paul II in 1984 from parts of the Archdiocese of Miami, the Diocese of Orlando, and the Diocese of St. Petersburg; Bishop John J. Nevins was the founding Bishop.

Bishops

Bishops of Venice
 John Joseph Nevins (1984-2007)
 Frank Joseph Dewane (2007–present, coadjutor bishop 2006-2007)

Educational institutions

High schools
Bishop Verot High School, Fort Myers
Cardinal Mooney High School, Sarasota
St. John Neumann High School, Naples
Rhodora J. Donahue Academy, Ave Maria

Elementary schools
 St. Charles Borromeo School, Port Charlotte
 St. Ann School, Naples
 St. Elizabeth Seton School, Naples 
 St. Catherine Catholic School, Sebring
 St. Andrew School, Cape Coral
 St. Francis Xavier School, Fort Myers
 St. Joseph School, Bradenton
 Epiphany Cathedral School, Venice 
 Incarnation School, Sarasota
 St. Martha School, Sarasota
 Rhodora J. Donahue Academy, Ave Maria

Special needs schools
 St. Mary Academy at Bishop Nevins Academy, Sarasota

See also

 Catholic Church by country
 Catholic Church hierarchy
 List of the Catholic dioceses of the United States
 List of Jesuit sites

References

External links 
Roman Catholic Diocese of Venice Official Site
Detailed parish information

 
Christian organizations established in 1984
Venice
Venice
1984 establishments in Florida